Lane is a city in Franklin County, Kansas, United States.  As of the 2020 census, the population of the city was 241.

History 
The first temporary settlement near what would become Lane occurred in 1838 when Rev. Robert Simerwell established a Baptist Mission Station "on the south side of Pottawatomie Creek" following the Potawatomie Trail of Death. When the Federal Government moved the Potawatomie (and the Baptist Mission) to the Kansas River valley in the mid-1840s, brothers William, Peter, and "Dutch" Henry Sherman were left as the first permanent settlers. The community was known as Dutch Henry's Crossing because a wagon road forded the creek near the Sherman cabin.

The area of Lane west of Kansas Avenue was originally laid out under the name Shermanville in 1855. It was renamed Lane in 1863 for James H. Lane, a leader of the Jayhawkers abolitionist movement, who served as one of the first Senators from Kansas.

When the Missouri Pacific Railroad arrived in 1879, a competing community, called either Emerson or Avondale, was laid out east of Kansas Avenue. Within two years the competition between the two towns ceased, and both townsites had merged into the single community of Lane. Lane was incorporated as a city in 1908.

Lane is near the site where in 1856, the abolitionist John Brown and four other of his followers hacked five pro-slavery men, one of whom was William Sherman, to death with broadswords near Mosquito Creek and Pottawatomie Creek. The event is commonly referred to as the Pottawatomie massacre.

Geography 
Lane is located at  (38.440265, -95.082339).

Climate
The climate in this area is characterized by hot, humid summers and generally mild to cool winters.  According to the Köppen Climate Classification system, Lane has a humid subtropical climate, abbreviated "Cfa" on climate maps.

Demographics

2010 census
As of the census of 2010, there were 225 people, 102 households, and 61 families residing in the city. The racial makeup of the city was 98.2% White, 0.9% Asian, 0.4% from other races, and 0.4% from two or more races. Hispanic or Latino of any race were 1.8% of the population.

There were 102 households, of which 23.5% had children under the age of 18 living with them, 47.1% were married couples living together, 9.8% had a female householder with no husband present, 2.9% had a male householder with no wife present, and 40.2% were non-families. 27.5% of all households were made up of individuals, and 5.9% had someone living alone who was 65 years of age or older. The average household size was 2.21 and the average family size was 2.72.

The median age in the city was 45.1 years. 21.8% of residents were under the age of 18; 8.5% were between the ages of 18 and 24; 19.5% were from 25 to 44; 35.1% were from 45 to 64; and 15.1% were 65 years of age or older. The gender makeup of the city was 52.0% male and 48.0% female.

2000 census
As of the census of 2000, there were 97 households, and 71 families residing in the city. The racial makeup of the city was 96.48% White, 0.39% Black or African American, 0.39% Native American, 0.39% Asian, and 2.34% from two or more races. Hispanic or Latino of any race were 0.39% of the population.

There were 97 households, out of which 33.0% had children under the age of 18 living with them, 57.7% were married couples living together, 11.3% had a female householder with no husband present, and 25.8% were non-families. 22.7% of all households were made up of individuals, and 7.2% had someone living alone who was 65 years of age or older. The average household size was 2.64 and the average family size was 2.99.

In the city, the population was spread out, with 26.2% under the age of 18, 10.5% from 18 to 24, 30.5% from 25 to 44, 20.3% from 45 to 64, and 12.5% who were 65 years of age or older. The median age was 35 years. For every 100 females, there were 103.2 males. For every 100 females age 18 and over, there were 110.0 males.

The median income for a household was $41,500, and the median income for a family was $42,500. Males had a median income of $32,031 versus $21,429 for females. The per capita income for the city was $19,144. About 11.4% of families and 12.0% of the population were below the poverty line, including 13.1% of those under the age of 18 and none of those 65 and older.

Education
Lane is a part of Central Heights USD 288 school district, headquarters located in Richmond. School mascot is Central Heights Vikings.

Lane schools were closed through school unification in 1965. The Lane High School mascot was Lane Lions.

References

Further reading

External links
 Lane - Directory of Public Officials
 USD 288, local school district
 Lane city map, KDOT

Cities in Kansas
Cities in Franklin County, Kansas